The 13th British Academy Video Game Awards awarded by the British Academy of Film and Television Arts, is an award ceremony that was held on 6 April 2017 at Tobacco Dock. The ceremony honoured achievement in video gaming in 2016 and was hosted by Danny Wallace.

Nominees 
The nominees for the 13th British Academy Video Games Awards were announced on 9 March 2017. Uncharted 4: A Thief's End received the most nominations with eight in total; Inside received the second most with seven nominations, followed by Firewatch with six and Overcooked, Overwatch, The Witness and The Last Guardian with four each.

The winners were announced during the awards ceremony on 6 April 2017.

Awards 
{| class=wikitable
| valign="top" width="50%" |

 Inside – Playdead/Playdead Abzû – Giant Squid/505 Games
 Dishonored 2 – Arkane Studios/Bethesda Softworks
 The Last Guardian – Japan Studio/Sony Interactive Entertainment
 Uncharted 4: A Thief's End – Naughty Dog/Sony Interactive Entertainment
 Unravel – Coldwood Interactive/Electronic Arts
| valign="top" |

 That Dragon, Cancer – Numinous Games/Numinous Games Batman: Arkham VR – Rocksteady Studios/Warner Bros. Interactive Entertainment
 Firewatch – Campo Santo/Panic
 Pokémon Go – Niantic/Niantic
 Unseen Diplomacy – Triangular Pixels/Triangular Pixels
 The Witness – Thekla, Inc./Thekla, Inc.
|-
| valign="top" width="50%" |

 The Last Guardian – Japan Studio/Sony Interactive Entertainment Battlefield 1 – EA DICE/Electronic Arts
 Doom – id Software/Bethesda Softworks
 Inside – Playdead/Playdead
 Rez Infinite – United Game Artists/Enhance Games
 Uncharted 4: A Thief's End – Naughty Dog/Sony Interactive Entertainment
| valign="top" |

 Pokémon Go – Niantic/Niantic The Banner Saga 2 – Stoic/Versus Evil
 Dawn of Titans – NaturalMotion/Zynga
 Deus Ex Go – Square Enix Montreal/Square Enix
 Pokémon Sun and Moon – Game Freak/The Pokémon Company
 Reigns – Nerial/Devolver Digital
|-
| valign="top" width="50%" |

 Uncharted 4: A Thief's End – Naughty Dog/Sony Interactive Entertainment Firewatch – Campo Santo/Panic
 Inside – Playdead/Playdead
 Overwatch – Blizzard Entertainment/Blizzard Entertainment
 Stardew Valley – ConcernedApe/Chucklefish
 Titanfall 2 – Respawn Entertainment/Electronic Arts
| valign="top" |

 Overwatch – Blizzard Entertainment/Blizzard Entertainment Battlefield 1 – EA DICE/Electronic Arts
 Forza Horizon 3 – Playground Games/Microsoft Studios
 Overcooked – Ghost Town Games/Team17
 Titanfall 2 – Respawn Entertainment/Electronic Arts
 Tom Clancy's The Division – Ubisoft Massive/Ubisoft
|-
| valign="top" width="50%" |

 Overcooked – Ghost Town Games/Team17 Batman: Arkham VR – Rocksteady Studios/Warner Bros. Interactive Entertainment
 Forza Horizon 3 – Playground Games/Microsoft Studios
 No Man's Sky – Hello Games/Hello Games
 Planet Coaster – Frontier Developments/Frontier Developments
 Virginia – Variable State/505 Games
| valign="top" |

 Virginia – Lyndon Holland Abzû – Austin Wintory
 Doom – Mick Gordon, Chris Hite, Chad Mossholder
 Inside – Martin Stig Andersen, SØS Gunver Ryberg
 The Last Guardian – Takeshi Furukawa
 Uncharted 4: A Thief's End – Henry Jackman, Jonathan Mayer, Scott Hanau
|-
| valign="top" width="50%" |

 Firewatch – Campo Santo/Panic Overcooked – Ghost Town Games/Team17
 Oxenfree – Night School Studio/Night School Studio
 That Dragon, Cancer – Numinous Games/Numinous Games
 Virginia – Variable State/505 Games
 The Witness – Thekla, Inc./Thekla, Inc.
| valign="top" |

 Inside – Playdead/Playdead Dishonored 2 – Arkane Studios/Bethesda Softworks
 Firewatch – Campo Santo/Panic
 Mafia III – Hangar 13/2K Games
 Oxenfree – Night School Studio/Night School Studio
 Uncharted 4: A Thief's End – Naughty Dog/Sony Interactive Entertainment
|-
| valign="top" width="50%" |

 Rocket League – Psyonix/Psyonix Destiny: Rise of Iron – Bungie/Activision
 Elite Dangerous: Horizons – Frontier Developments/Frontier Developments
 Eve Online – CCP Games/CCP Games
 Final Fantasy XIV: A Realm Reborn – Square Enix/Square Enix
 Hitman – IO Interactive/Square Enix
| valign="top" |

 Inside – Playdead/Playdead Firewatch – Campo Santo/Panic
 The Last Guardian – Japan Studio/Sony Interactive Entertainment
 Overwatch – Blizzard Entertainment/Blizzard Entertainment
 Unravel – Coldwood Interactive/Electronic Arts
 The Witness – Thekla, Inc./Thekla, Inc.
|-
| valign="top" width="50%" |

 Overcooked – Ghost Town Games/Team17 Lego Star Wars: The Force Awakens – Mike Taylor, Jamie Eden and James Norton, TT Games/Warner Bros. Interactive Entertainment
 The Playroom VR – Japan Studio/Sony Interactive Entertainment
 Pokémon Go – Niantic/Niantic
 Ratchet and Clank – Insomniac Games/Sony Interactive Entertainment
 Toca Hair Salon 3 – Toca Boca/Toca 
| valign="top" |

 Cissy Jones – Firewatch as Delilah Alex Hernandez – Mafia III as Lincoln Clay
 Emily Rose – Uncharted 4: A Thief's End as Elena Fisher
 Navid Negahban – 1979 Revolution: Black Friday as Hajj Agha
 Nolan North – Uncharted 4: A Thief's End as Nathan Drake
 Troy Baker – Uncharted 4: A Thief's End as Sam Drake
|-
| valign="top" width="50%" |

 Inside - Playdead/Playdead Battlefield 1 – EA DICE/Electronic Arts
 Dishonored 2 - Arkane Studios/Bethesda Softworks
 Overwatch - Blizzard Entertainment/Blizzard Entertainment
 Titanfall 2 - Respawn Entertainment/Electronic Arts
 The Witness - Thekla, Inc./Thekla, Inc.
|}

 BAFTA Special Award 
 Brenda Romero BAFTA Ones to Watch Award 
 Among the Stones - Lukasz Gomula, Alberto Taiuti, James Wood, Roberton Macken, Kevin McKenna, Rory Sweeney Pentagrab - Andrew Fullarton, Thomas Slade, Nick Kondylis, Cari Watterton, Dale Smith
 Rebound - Kieran Gallagher, Isaac Pringle, Mark Tempini, Andrew Graham, Alexander MacDiarmid, Vladislav Veselinov, Craig Russell, Alexandra Donaldson

 AMD eSports Audience Award 
 Clash Royale
 Counter Strike: Global Offensive
 Dota 2
 League of Legends
 Overwatch
 Street Fighter V

Games with multiple nominations and wins

Nominations

Wins

References

External links
13th BAFTA Video Games Awards page

British Academy Games Awards ceremonies
British Academy Games
British Academy Games
British Academy Games